is a 2013 Japanese psychological horror film directed by Takeshi Furusawa and based on the novel Rūmumeito by Aya Imamura.

Cast
Keiko Kitagawa as Harumi Hagio
Kyoko Fukada as Reiko Nishimura
Kengo Kora as Kensuke Kudo
Hiroyuki Onoue
Chihiro Otsuka
Mariko Tsutsui
Yukijiro Hotaru
Tomorowo Taguchi
Riko Yoshida as young Harumi

External links
 ルームメイト(2013) at allcinema 
 ルームメイト(2013) at KINENOTE 
 

2013 psychological thriller films
2013 films
2013 horror films
Japanese action horror films
Films based on Japanese novels
Films directed by Takeshi Furusawa
Japanese horror films
Japanese psychological horror films
2010s Japanese films